Lambda Centauri, Latinized from λ Centauri, is a star in the southern circumpolar constellation of Centaurus. It has an apparent visual magnitude of +3.13, which is bright enough to be seen with the naked eye from the Southern Hemisphere and places it among the brighter members of this constellation. Although a putative solitary star, it has a candidate proper motion companion at an angular separation of 0.73 arcseconds along a position angle of 135°. The nebula IC 2944 lies nearby.

Lambda Centauri is a B-type giant star with a stellar classification of B9 III (although it has also been classified as A1 III). The latter is giving the star an oblate shape with an equatorial bulge that is 17% larger than the polar radius. The star's outer atmosphere has an effective temperature of 9,880 K, giving it a blue-white hue.

Based upon the position and movement of this star through space, it is a likely member of the Gould Belt. In particular, it belongs to the Lower Centaurus–Crux (LCC) group of the Scorpius–Centaurus association, which is the nearest OB association to the Sun. This is a loose grouping of stars that share a common motion through space and therefore formed in the same molecular cloud.

Gallery

References

B-type giants
Lower Centaurus Crux
Gould Belt

Centaurus (constellation)
Centauri, Lambda
Durchmusterung objects
100841
056561
4467